The Amazonian antshrike (Thamnophilus amazonicus) is a species of bird in the family Thamnophilidae, the antbirds.  It occurs in the Amazon Basin of Brazil, and east to Maranhão state; also Amazonian Colombia, Ecuador, Peru,  and Bolivia. It is in the Guianas in Guyana, Suriname and French Guiana, also two regions of Venezuela. Its natural habitats are subtropical or tropical moist lowland forests and subtropical or tropical swamps.

The Amazonian antshrike is found in the entire Amazon Basin and the Guianas, minus a small region in southwestern Venezuela and Roraima state Brazil in the northwest section of the Basin.

The Amazonian antshrike was described and illustrated by the English zoologist Philip Sclater in 1858 and given its current binomial name Thamnophilus amazonicus.

References

External links

Amazonian antshrike photo gallery VIREO Photo-High Res

Amazonian antshrike
Birds of the Amazon Basin
Birds of the Guianas
Amazonian antshrike
Amazonian antshrike
Birds of Brazil
Taxonomy articles created by Polbot